Hazel L. Sive is a South African-born biologist and educator. She is Dean of the College of Science, and Professor of Biology at Northeastern University. Sive is a research pioneer, award-winning educator and innovator in the higher education space who was elected as a Fellow of the American Association for the Advancement of Science in November 2021. Prior to June 2020, she was a Member of Whitehead Institute for Biomedical Research, Professor of Biology at Massachusetts Institute of Technology and Associate Member of the Broad Institute of MIT and Harvard. Sive studies development of the vertebrate embryo, and has made unique contributions to understanding how the face forms and how the brain develops its structure. Her lab also seeks to understand the origins of neurological and neurodevelopmental disorders, such as epilepsy, autism, Pitt–Hopkins syndrome and 16p11.2 deletion syndrome.

Education
Sive received her Bachelor of Science with honors in 1979 from the University of the Witwatersrand in Johannesburg, South Africa with a double major in zoology and chemistry. She left South Africa for England where she taught secondary school science. She then went to the United States for graduate studies in molecular biology under Robert G. Roeder. She received a PhD from Rockefeller University in 1986. Sive was a postdoctoral trainee with Harold Weintraub at the Fred Hutchinson Cancer Research Center until 1991.

Research
Sive is a pioneer in many research areas and has developed multiple techniques.

These include analysis of the extreme anterior domain (EAD), a unique and important embryonic region she named. She used a simple anterior organ, the mucus-secreting cement gland of the frog Xenopus, to define the genetic network required for anterior position. The EAD also gives rise to the mouth and the Sive group has defined key steps necessary for mouth formation. Using their ‘facial transplant’ technique, her group made the unprecedented discovery that the EAD is also a facial signaling center, which guides neural crest cells into the developing face, where they form the jaws and other structures. Since the EAD is present in humans, the work is directly relevant for understanding human craniofacial anomalies.

Another focus of Sive's research has been nervous system patterning. Using novel techniques in subtractive cloning, her laboratory defined some of the earliest molecular markers and regulators of the nervous system in both Xenopus and the zebrafish Danio. Expression of these genes answered the age-old question of when the embryo decides to make a nervous system: Sive showed that future brain cells are set aside when the embryo is just a ball of cells. Function of these genes, including otx2 and zic1 (opl), was studied using hormone-inducible fusion proteins, a technique first used in embryos by Sive. She also developed the first zebrafish ‘explant’ culture method, and so identified cell interactions that initiate brain development. As well, Sive identified retinoic acid as a regulator of brain patterning, and demonstrated its activity on expression of hindbrain Hox genes.
And she defined additional roles for fibroblast growth factors in precise patterning of the hindbrain.

As structure and function are closely allied, Sive also focuses on how three-dimensional structure of the brain is generated by the processes of morphogenesis. Sive first identified and named “basal constriction” as a cell-shape-change occurring during brain morphogenesis. In addition, she identified and named the process of “epithelial relaxation,” a cell-sheet-stretching process that occurs as brain ventricles form. Indeed, she pioneered use of zebrafish to study the brain ventricular system—cavities filled with cerebrospinal fluid (CSF) that form the body's “third circulation.”  Using a unique drainage assay, Sive identified Retinol Binding Protein in the CSF as essential for survival of brain cells.

Sive has a long-standing interest in neurodevelopmental disorders, including those relating to mental health. A great challenge is that these disorders often involve multiple genes, whose contributions to a disorder is frequently unclear. Sive pioneered zebrafish as a tool for probing gene function associated with autism spectrum disorders. Her group has identified genes that interact and contribute to brain dysfunction in the prevalent and serious 16p11.2 deletion syndrome, most recently implicating lipid metabolism in symptomatology.

In running her eponymous lab, she is a faculty member in the Northeastern University Biology department. She was formerly a Member of the Whitehead Institute and joined the MIT faculty in 1991. The recipient of numerous awards, Sive was chosen as a Searle Scholar and received the National Science Foundation Young Investigator Award in 1992.

In November 2021, she was elected as an AAAS Fellow. She received the recognition for fundamental discoveries advancing our understanding of early embryonic development, particularly the development of the nervous system in vertebrates, and for her leadership in teaching, mentoring, and diversity in higher education.

Academic roles
In 1993, Sive founded the Cold Spring Harbor Course on Early Development of Xenopus. This course continues to run annually.

In 2015, she was named a MacVicar Faculty Fellow, MIT's highest award for undergraduate teaching She additionally received the MIT School of Science Teaching Award (2003), MIT's Alan J. Lazarus Advising Award in 2016, and the MIS School of Science Teaching Award for Undergraduate Education in 2019. Several of her courses are offered through the MIT OpenCourseWare online initiative.

Sive was chair of the MIT Biology Undergraduate Program (2003-2006) and served as the first Associate Dean for the MIT School of Science (2006-2013), with oversight for education and equity.  During her tenure in that role, she was instrumental in compiling the 2011 Report on the Status of Women Faculty in the MIT Schools of Science and Engineering, which uncovered both positive aspects as well as an ongoing need for oversight of female faculty trajectory. Sive has served as chair of the MIT Committee on Student Life and as founding chair of the MIT Faculty Postdoctoral Advisory Committee.

In 2014, Sive founded and is Director of the MIT-Africa initiative, leading the Africa Advisory Committee to write a Strategic Plan for MIT Engagement in Africa.

In 2017, Sive was named Director of Higher Education at the MIT Jameel World Education Lab (J-WEL).

As Dean of the College of Science at Northeastern University from June 2020, Sive has articulated multiple goals to lead the college forward, and to reinvent the future of Science. Sive has laid out the following Vision for the Northeastern College of Science: Across a culture of respect and action towards equity, we are solving the greatest challenges of our planet, with groundbreaking fundamental and applied research.  Through innovative, research-linked, experiential education, our students are empowered to be confident, entrepreneurial,  problem-solvers, with flexible skills for a vast set of careers. The importance of Science is enormous, and everyone uses Science, everyday!

References 

Living people
Massachusetts Institute of Technology School of Science faculty
South African women scientists
South African biologists
University of the Witwatersrand alumni
Rockefeller University alumni
1956 births